Kachō may refer to:

 Kachō Kōsaku Shima, Japanese manga (cartoon) series
 Kachō-no-miya, the Imperial Branch House miyake
 Kachō, a Japanese corporate title